The structure, Ovdan, was built in the 14th century in the Balakhani settlement by order of Shirvanshah Emir Khaja Zeynaddin.

History 
The structure of the stairs is as high as that in the palace of the Shirvanshahs. It is believed that after the construction of the Sand Bath, the first periods were supplied with water taken from Ovdan.

A very small part of Ovdan is on the ground, the main part is under the ground. 40 underground stairsteps that are carved out of bedrock go straight down to the water source, which is at a distance of 15 meters from the entrance. Since the underground part of the building is in the form of an arched corridor, the possibility of collapse is non-existent due to the pressure of the weight of the soil layer on it. In the past, Balakhani used to get drinkable water from this source.

Ovdan was used by the population until the occupation in April 1920. In the following periods, it was neglected. In 2019, restoration of the monument was started.

Gallery

See also 
 Haji Shahla Mosque
 Shakiragha Mausoleum
 Shirvanshah's Palace Mausoleum

References 

Buildings and structures completed in the 14th century
Islamic architecture
Tourist attractions in Azerbaijan
Tourist attractions in Baku
Monuments of Balakhani